A vase ( or ) is an open container. It can be made from a number of materials, such as ceramics, glass, non-rusting metals, such as aluminium, brass, bronze, or stainless steel. Even wood has been used to make vases, either by using tree species that naturally resist rot, such as teak, or by applying a protective coating to conventional wood or plastic. Vases are often decorated, and they are often used to hold cut flowers. Vases come in different sizes to support whatever flower it is holding or keeping in place.

Vases generally share a similar shape. The foot or the base may be bulbous, flat, carinate, or another shape. The body forms the main portion of the piece. Some vases have a shoulder, where the body curves inward, a neck, which gives height, and a lip, where the vase flares back out at the top. Some vases are also given handles.

Various styles and types of vases have been developed around the world in different time periods, such as Chinese ceramics and Native American pottery. In the pottery of ancient Greece "vase-painting" is the traditional term covering the famous fine painted pottery, often with many figures in scenes from Greek mythology.  Such pieces may be referred to as vases regardless of their shape; most were in fact used for holding or serving liquids, and many would more naturally be called cups, jugs and so on. In 2003, Grayson Perry won the Turner Prize for his ceramics, typically in vase form.

History 
There is a long history of the form and function of the vase in nearly all developed cultures, and often ceramic objects are the only artistic evidence left from vanished cultures. In the beginning stages of pottery, the coiling method of building was the most utilized technique to make pottery. The coiling method is the act of working the clay into long cylindrical strips that later become smooth walls.

Potter's wheel 
The potter's wheel was probably invented in Mesopotamia by the 4th millennium BCE, but spread across nearly all Eurasia and much of Africa, though it remained unknown in the New World until the arrival of Europeans. The earliest discovery of the origins of the potter's wheel was in southern Iraq.  The discovery of this technique was beneficial to the people of south Iraq because it served as a substitute for their previous inefficient traditions.  Upon this new technique, it would then grow gradually and even be adopted for the use of decorating pottery.

Garden vase 
Garden vases are usually V-shaped but they can also be cylindrical or bowl-shaped. They are usually made of ceramic or, today, plastic.  Examples are the Torlonia Vase and the Medici Vase in the Uffizi Gallery in Florence.

Shapes

Gallery

Material types 

 Glass
 Ceramic
 Crystal 
 Metal
 Plastic
 Porcelain
 Wood

See also

Ceramic art
Corning Museum of Glass
Pottery
Urn

References

External links

 
Containers
Vessels
Decorative arts
Pottery shapes